The Combined Security Transition Command – Afghanistan (CSTC-A, pronounced "see stick-uh") was a multinational, U.S. led, military organization during the War in Afghanistan.

As of 2019, the organization's missions were:

 Budget, account, and execute more than $50 billion in Afghanistan Security Force Funds across multiple fiscal years.
 Manage all foreign military sales for the Afghan National Defense Security Forces (ANDSF). 
 Plan, budget, and execute all of the infrastructure projects in support of the Afghanistan National Defense and Security Forces.
 Train, Advise and Assist the Afghanistan government in these areas:
 Plan, Program, Budget, and Execute
 Transparency, Accountability, and Oversight
 Rule of Law
 Sustainment

History
In April 2006, the Combined Security Transition Command-Afghanistan (CSTC-A) was formed from the Office of Security Cooperation-Afghanistan. In partnership with the government of the Islamic Republic of Afghanistan (GIRoA) and the North Atlantic Treaty Organization (NATO), CSTC-A was charged with planning, programming, and implementing reform of the Afghan Security Forces consisting of the Afghan National Army (ANA) and the Afghan National Police (ANP) in order to develop a stable Afghanistan, strengthen the rule of law, and deter and defeat terrorism within its borders.

In April 2009, the Strasbourg-Kehl Summit made the decision to establish NATO Training Mission-Afghanistan (NTM-A), an organization responsible for the training and development of Afghan Security Forces.  Seven months later, on November 21, 2009, NTM-A was formally activated under CSTC-A.  With the headquarters at Camp Eggers, Kabul, the Commander of the organization commanded both CSTC-A and NTM-A. At its peak structure, CSTC-A/NTM-A was an 8,000-member advisor/mentor, combat theater forward-deployed strategic command recognized as an Army Corps-level Headquarters.  With the Train, Advise and Assist (TAA) mission associated with the Ministry of Defense (MoD), Ministry of Interior (MoI), and Non-Security Ministries, the organization was known as the Deputy Commander - Ministerial Advisor Group, or DCOM-MAG.

In November 2013, with NTM-A functionally aligned under International Security Assistance Force's Joint Command (IJC), NTM-A and CSTC-A disaggregated, allowing each organization to focus on its unique mission set.  Several months later, CSTC-A prepared Camp Eggers for turnover to the U.S. Department of State and transferred the unit's personnel and equipment to the Headquarters International Security Assistance Force (HQ ISAF) compound while simultaneously drawing down to Resolute Support mission numbers.

With the realignment of advisors toward establishing a Functionally-Based Security Force Assistance set in July 2014, DCOM-MAG/CSTC-A was recast as the Deputy Chief of Staff Security Assistance (DCOS SA)/CSTC-A. Along with the mission to budget, account, and execute more than $50 billion of Afghanistan Security Force Funds across multiple fiscal years, manage all foreign military sales for the Afghan National Defense Security Forces (ANDSF), and plan, budget, and execute all of the infrastructure projects in support of the ANDSF, DCOS SA/CSTC-A currently provides the TAA mission for four Essential Functions – EF1 (Plan, Program, Budget, and Execute), EF2 (Transparency, Accountability, and Oversight), EF3 (Rule of Law), and EF5 (Sustainment).

DOD shut CSTC-A down in June 2021 and transferred many of its responsibilities to DOD’s newly created Defense Security Cooperation Management Office-Afghanistan (DSCMO-A).

Campaign participation credit
 Afghanistan:
 Consolidation I
 Consolidation II
 Consolidation III
 Transition I
 Transition II

List of commanders
 MG Robert Durbin, 2006-2007
 MG Richard P. Formica, 2007-2009
 LTG William B. Caldwell, IV, 2009-2011
 LTG Daniel P. Bolger, 2011-2013
 LTG Kenneth E. Tovo, 2013-2013
 MG Kevin R. Wendel, 2013-2014
 MG Harold J. Greene, 2013-2014 (Deputy COM: KIA AUG05,2014)
 MG Todd T. Semonite, 2014-2015
 MG Gordon B. Davis Jr., 2015-2016
 MG Richard Kaiser, 2016-2017
 MG Robin Fontes, July 2017–October 2018
 LTG James Rainey, October 2018–November 2019
 LTG E. John Deedrick, November 2019–July 2021

Unit decorations

References

External links
CSTC-A Official Website
Afghan Regional Security Integration Command-South

.
Military units and formations of the War in Afghanistan (2001–2021)
2000s in Afghanistan
2010s in Afghanistan
Military units and formations established in 2006
Military units and formations disestablished in 2014
2006 establishments in Afghanistan
2014 disestablishments in Afghanistan